Kripke semantics (also known as relational semantics or frame semantics, and often confused with possible world semantics) is a formal semantics for non-classical logic systems created in the late 1950s and early 1960s by Saul Kripke and André Joyal. It was first conceived for modal logics, and later adapted to intuitionistic logic and other non-classical systems. The development of Kripke semantics was a breakthrough in the theory of non-classical logics, because the model theory of such logics was almost non-existent before Kripke (algebraic semantics existed, but were considered 'syntax in disguise').

Semantics of modal logic

The language of propositional  modal logic consists of a countably infinite set of propositional variables, a set of truth-functional connectives (in this article  and ), and the modal operator  ("necessarily").

Basic definitions
 
A Kripke frame or modal frame is a pair , where W is a (possibly empty) set, and R is a binary relation on W. Elements
of W are called nodes or worlds, and R is known as the accessibility relation.

A Kripke model is a triple , where

  if and only if ,
  if and only if  for all  such that .
We read  as “w satisfies
A”, “A is satisfied in w”, or
“w forces A”. The relation  is called the
satisfaction relation, evaluation, or forcing relation.
The satisfaction relation is uniquely determined by its
value on propositional variables.

A formula A is valid in:
 a model , if  for all w ∈ W,
 a class C of frames or models, if it is valid in every member of C.
We define Thm(C) to be the set of all formulas that are valid in
C.  Conversely, if X is a set of formulas, let Mod(X) be the
class of all frames which validate every formula from X.

A modal logic (i.e., a set of formulas) L is sound with
respect to a class of frames C, if L ⊆ Thm(C). L is
complete wrt C if L ⊇ Thm(C).

Correspondence and completeness 
Semantics is useful for investigating a logic (i.e. a derivation system) only if the semantic consequence relation reflects its syntactical counterpart, the syntactic consequence relation (derivability). It is vital to know which modal logics are sound and complete with respect to a class of Kripke frames, and to determine also which class that is.

For any class C of Kripke frames, Thm(C) is a normal modal logic (in particular, theorems of the minimal normal modal logic, K, are valid in every Kripke model). However, the converse does not hold in general: while most of the modal systems studied are complete of classes of frames described by simple conditions, 
Kripke incomplete normal modal logics do exist. A natural example of such a system is Japaridze's polymodal logic.

A normal modal logic L corresponds to a class of frames C, if C = Mod(L). In other words, C is the largest class of frames such that L is sound wrt C. It follows that L is Kripke complete if and only if it is complete of its corresponding class.

Consider the schema T : .
T is valid in any reflexive frame : if
, then 
since w R w. On the other hand, a frame which
validates T has to be reflexive: fix w ∈ W, and
define satisfaction of a propositional variable p as follows:
 if and only if w R u. Then
, thus 
by T, which means w R w using the definition of
. T corresponds to the class of reflexive
Kripke frames.

It is often much easier to characterize the corresponding class of
L than to prove its completeness, thus correspondence serves as a
guide to completeness proofs. Correspondence is also used to show
incompleteness of modal logics: suppose 
L1 ⊆ L2 are normal modal logics that
correspond to the same class of frames, but L1 does not
prove all theorems of L2. Then L1 is
Kripke incomplete. For example, the schema  generates an incomplete logic, as it
corresponds to the same class of frames as GL (viz. transitive and
converse well-founded frames), but does not prove the GL-tautology .

Common modal axiom schemata 
The following table lists common modal axioms together with their corresponding classes. The naming of the axioms often varies; Here, axiom K is named after Saul Kripke; axiom T is named after the truth axiom in epistemic logic; axiom D is named after deontic logic; axiom B is named after L. E. J. Brouwer; and axioms 4 and 5 are named based on C. I. Lewis's numbering of symbolic logic systems. 

Note that for axiom D,  implicity implies , which means that for every possible world in the model, there is always at least one possible world accessible from it (which could be itself). This implicit implication  is similar to the implicit implication by existential quantifier on the range of quantification.

Common modal systems

Canonical models

For any normal modal logic, L, a Kripke model (called the canonical model) can be constructed that refutes precisely the non-theorems of
L, by an adaptation of the standard technique of using maximal consistent sets as models. Canonical Kripke models play a 
role similar to the Lindenbaum–Tarski algebra construction in algebraic
semantics.

A set of formulas is L-consistent if no contradiction can be derived from it using the theorems of L, and Modus Ponens. A maximal L-consistent set (an L-MCS
for short) is an L-consistent set that has no proper L-consistent superset.

The canonical model of L is a Kripke model
, where W is the set of all L-MCS,
  if and only if for every formula , if  then ,
  if and only if .
The canonical model is a model of L, as every L-MCS contains
all theorems of L. By Zorn's lemma, each L-consistent set
is contained in an L-MCS, in particular every formula
unprovable in L has a counterexample in the canonical model.

The main application of canonical models are completeness proofs. Properties of the canonical model of K immediately imply completeness of K with respect to the class of all Kripke frames.
This argument does not work for arbitrary L, because there is no guarantee that the underlying frame of the canonical model satisfies the frame conditions of L.

We say that a formula or a set X of formulas is canonical
with respect to a property P of Kripke frames, if
 X is valid in every frame that satisfies P,
 for any normal modal logic L that contains X, the underlying frame of the canonical model of L satisfies P.
A union of canonical sets of formulas is itself canonical.
It follows from the preceding discussion that any logic axiomatized by
a canonical set of formulas is Kripke complete, and
compact.

The axioms T, 4, D, B, 5, H, G (and thus
any combination of them) are canonical. GL and Grz are not
canonical, because they are not compact. The axiom M by itself is
not canonical (Goldblatt, 1991), but the combined logic S4.1 (in
fact, even K4.1) is canonical.

In general, it is undecidable whether a given axiom is
canonical. We know a nice sufficient condition: Henrik Sahlqvist identified a broad class of formulas (now called
Sahlqvist formulas) such that
 a Sahlqvist formula is canonical,
 the class of frames corresponding to a Sahlqvist formula is first-order definable,
 there is an algorithm that computes the corresponding frame condition to a given Sahlqvist formula.
This is a powerful criterion: for example, all axioms
listed above as canonical are (equivalent to) Sahlqvist formulas.

Finite model property

A logic has the finite model property (FMP) if it is complete
with respect to a class of finite frames. An application of this
notion is the decidability question: it
follows from
Post's theorem that a recursively axiomatized modal logic L
which has FMP is decidable, provided it is decidable whether a given
finite frame is a model of L. In particular, every finitely
axiomatizable logic with FMP is decidable.

There are various methods for establishing FMP for a given logic.
Refinements and extensions of the canonical model construction often
work, using tools such as filtration or
unravelling. As another possibility,
completeness proofs based on cut-free
sequent calculi usually produce finite models
directly.

Most of the modal systems used in practice (including all listed
above) have FMP.

In some cases, we can use FMP to prove Kripke completeness of a logic:
every normal modal logic is complete with respect to a class of
modal algebras, and a finite modal algebra can be transformed
into a Kripke frame. As an example, Robert Bull proved using this method
that every normal extension of S4.3 has FMP, and is Kripke
complete.

Multimodal logics

Kripke semantics has a straightforward generalization to logics with
more than one modality. A Kripke frame for a language with
 as the set of its necessity operators
consists of a non-empty set W equipped with binary relations
Ri for each i ∈ I. The definition of a
satisfaction relation is modified as follows:

  if and only if 

A simplified semantics, discovered by Tim Carlson, is often used for
polymodal provability logics. A Carlson model is a structure

with a single accessibility relation R, and subsets
Di ⊆ W for each modality. Satisfaction is
defined as

  if and only if 

Carlson models are easier to visualize and to work with than usual
polymodal Kripke models; there are, however, Kripke complete polymodal
logics which are Carlson incomplete.

Semantics of intuitionistic logic

Kripke semantics for intuitionistic logic follows the same
principles as the semantics of modal logic, but it uses a different
definition of satisfaction.

An intuitionistic Kripke model is a triple
, where  is a preordered Kripke frame, and  satisfies the following conditions:
  if and only if for all ,  implies ,
 not .

The negation of A, ¬A, could be defined as an abbreviation for A → ⊥.  If for all u such that w ≤ u, not u ⊩ A, then w ⊩ A → ⊥ is vacuously true, so w ⊩ ¬A.

Intuitionistic logic is sound and complete with respect to its Kripke
semantics, and it has the finite model property.

Intuitionistic first-order logic

Let L be a first-order language. A Kripke
model of L is a triple
, where
 is an intuitionistic Kripke frame, Mw is a
(classical) L-structure for each node w ∈ W, and
the following compatibility conditions hold whenever u ≤ v:
 the domain of Mu is included in the domain of Mv,
 realizations of function symbols in Mu and Mv agree on elements of Mu,
 for each n-ary predicate P and elements a1,...,an ∈ Mu: if P(a1,...,an) holds in Mu, then it holds in Mv.
Given an evaluation e of variables by elements of Mw, we
define the satisfaction relation :
  if and only if  holds in Mw,
  if and only if for all ,  implies ,
 not ,
  if and only if there exists an  such that ,
  if and only if for every  and every  , .
Here e(x→a) is the evaluation which gives x the
value a, and otherwise agrees with e.

See a slightly different formalization in.

Kripke–Joyal semantics

As part of the independent development of sheaf theory, it was realised around 1965 that Kripke semantics was intimately related to the treatment of existential quantification in  topos theory. That is, the 'local' aspect of existence for sections of a sheaf was a kind of logic of the 'possible'. Though this development was the work of a number of people, the name Kripke–Joyal semantics is often used in this connection.

Model constructions

As in classical model theory, there are methods for
constructing a new Kripke model from other models.

The natural homomorphisms in Kripke semantics are called
p-morphisms (which is short for pseudo-epimorphism, but the
latter term is rarely used). A p-morphism of Kripke frames
 such that
 f preserves the accessibility relation, i.e., u R v implies f(u) R’ f(v),
 whenever f(u) R’ v’, there is a v ∈ W such that u R v and f(v) = v’.
A p-morphism of Kripke models  and
 is a p-morphism of their
underlying frames , which
satisfies
  if and only if , for any propositional variable p.

P-morphisms are a special kind of bisimulations. In general, a
bisimulation between frames  and
 is a relation
B ⊆ W × W’, which satisfies
the following “zig-zag” property:
 if u B u’ and u R v, there exists v’ ∈ W’ such that v B v’ and u’ R’ v’,
 if u B u’ and u’ R’ v’, there exists v ∈ W such that v B v’ and u R v.
A bisimulation of models is additionally required to preserve forcing
of atomic formulas:
 if w B w’, then  if and only if , for any propositional variable p.
The key property which follows from this definition is that
bisimulations (hence also p-morphisms) of models preserve the
satisfaction of all formulas, not only propositional variables.

We can transform a Kripke model into a tree using
unravelling. Given a model  and a fixed
node w0 ∈ W, we define a model
, where W’ is the
set of all finite sequences
 such
that wi R wi+1 for all
i < n, and  if and only if
 for a propositional variable
p. The definition of the accessibility relation R’
varies; in the simplest case we put
,
but many applications need the reflexive and/or transitive closure of
this relation, or similar modifications.

Filtration is a useful construction which uses to prove FMP for many logics. Let X be a set of
formulas closed under taking subformulas. An X-filtration of a
model  is a mapping f from W to a model
 such that
 f is a surjection,
 f preserves the accessibility relation, and (in both directions) satisfaction of variables p ∈ X,
It follows that f preserves satisfaction of all formulas from
X. In typical applications, we take f as the projection
onto the quotient of W over the relation
 u ≡X v if and only if for all A ∈ X,  if and only if .
As in the case of unravelling, the definition of the accessibility
relation on the quotient varies.

General frame semantics
The main defect of Kripke semantics is the existence of Kripke incomplete logics, and logics which are complete but not compact. It can be remedied by equipping Kripke frames with extra structure which restricts the set of possible valuations, using ideas from algebraic semantics. This gives rise to the general frame semantics.

Computer science applications

Blackburn et al. (2001) point out that because a relational structure is simply a set together with a collection of relations on that set, it is unsurprising that relational structures are to be found just about everywhere. As an example from theoretical computer science, they give labeled transition systems, which model program execution. Blackburn et al. thus claim because of this connection that modal languages are ideally suited in providing "internal, local perspective on relational structures." (p. xii)

History and terminology

Similar work that predated Kripke's revolutionary semantic breakthroughs:
 Rudolf Carnap seems to have been the first to have the idea that one can give a possible world semantics for the modalities of necessity and possibility by means of giving the valuation function a parameter that ranges over Leibnizian possible worlds.  Bayart develops this idea further, but neither gave recursive definitions of satisfaction in the style introduced by Tarski;
 J.C.C. McKinsey and Alfred Tarski developed an approach to modeling modal logics that is still influential in modern research, namely the algebraic approach, in which Boolean algebras with operators are used as models. Bjarni Jónsson and Tarski established the representability of Boolean algebras with operators in terms of frames. If the two ideas had been put together, the result would have been precisely frame models, which is to say Kripke models, years before Kripke. But no one (not even Tarski) saw the connection at the time.
Arthur Prior, building on unpublished work of C. A. Meredith, developed a translation of sentential modal logic into classical predicate logic that, if he had combined it with the usual model theory for the latter, would have produced a model theory equivalent to Kripke models for the former. But his approach was resolutely syntactic and anti-model-theoretic.
 Stig Kanger gave a rather more complex approach to the interpretation of modal logic, but one that contains many of the key ideas of Kripke's approach.  He first noted the relationship between conditions on accessibility relations and Lewis-style axioms for modal logic.  Kanger failed, however, to give a completeness proof for his system;
 Jaakko Hintikka gave a semantics in his papers introducing epistemic logic that is a simple variation of Kripke's semantics, equivalent to the characterisation of valuations by means of maximal consistent sets.  He doesn't give inference rules for epistemic logic, and so cannot give a completeness proof;
 Richard Montague had many of the key ideas contained in Kripke's work, but he did not regard them as significant, because he had no completeness proof, and so did not publish until after Kripke's papers had created a sensation in the logic community;
 Evert Willem Beth presented a semantics of intuitionistic logic based on trees, which closely resembles Kripke semantics, except for using a more cumbersome definition of satisfaction.

See also
 Alexandrov topology
 Normal modal logic
 Two-dimensionalism
 Muddy Children Puzzle

Notes 
aAfter Andrzej Grzegorczyk.

References

External links

 N.B: Constructive = intuitionistic.

 

Modal logic
Model theory
Mathematical logic
Philosophical logic
Sheaf theory
Non-classical logic

de:Kripke-Semantik